Tenhults IBK was a floorball club in Tenhult, Sweden, established 1988.

The men's team played in the Swedish top division during the 1989-1990 season.

Later, Tenhults IF began to play floorball instead.

References

1988 establishments in Sweden
Sport in Jönköping County
Sports clubs established in 1988
Swedish floorball teams